Macintosh Classic may refer to:

Macintosh Classic, a Macintosh computer model
Macintosh Classic II
Classic Mac OS, Apple's primary operating system for the Mac prior to Mac OS X
Classic (Mac OS X), a Mac OS X environment that allows Mac OS 9 applications to run in Mac OS X